The Camden Riversharks were an American  professional baseball team based in Camden, New Jersey, from 2001 to 2015. They were a member of the Liberty Division of the Atlantic League of Professional Baseball, which was not at that time affiliated with Major League Baseball. The Riversharks played their home games at Campbell's Field, which was situated at the base of the Benjamin Franklin Bridge.  Due to its location on the Delaware River, the ballpark offered a clear view of the Philadelphia skyline. The "Riversharks" name referred to the location of Camden on the Delaware River, and the primary logo incorporated the Benjamin Franklin Bridge that links Camden to Philadelphia.

On October 21, 2015, the Camden Riversharks announced they would cease operations immediately due to the inability to reach an agreement on lease terms with the owner of Campbell's Field, the Camden County Improvement Authority (the authority had purchased Campbell's Field from Rutgers University two months prior). 

The Riversharks were replaced by the New Britain Bees, a separate franchise for the 2016 season.

History of Camden baseball 

The Riversharks were not the first baseball team to call Camden home. The Camden Merritt, named for former state senator Albert Merritt, of the Interstate Association played there in 1883, and disbanded the same year. Another team from the Tri-State League played in Camden in 1904, and they too disbanded, during the season. The inception of the Riversharks in 2001 was the first professional baseball team in Camden since the 1904 season.

Logos and uniforms

The team colors of the Camden Riversharks were navy blue, Columbia blue, and white. The Riversharks' last logo, introduced in 2005 with a new ownership group, consisted of a shark biting a baseball bat superimposed over a stylized depiction of the Benjamin Franklin Bridge. The Riversharks' former logo, used from 2001 to 2005, consisted of a navy blue ring with a shark centered above the wordmark superimposed over it.

The Riversharks' primary caps were navy blue with a Columbia blue visor and the "shark-fin" cap logo centered on the front. The home jerseys were white with navy blue piping and feature the "Sharks" wordmark across the front in white with navy blue and Columbia blue outline. The away jerseys were gray with the "Camden" wordmark centered across the jersey in navy blue with Columbia blue outline.

Season-by-season records

Retired numbers 
 42 (Jackie Robinson) Second baseman, Retired throughout professional baseball on April 15, 1997

 16 (Brad Strauss) 1B / 3B / OF / DH, Retired by the Riversharks on August 12, 2007

Notable alumni
Kim Batiste
Danny Bautista
Alberto Castillo
Mike Costanzo
Ben Davis
Stephen Drew
Pedro Feliz
Brian Lawrence
José Lima
Blaine Neal
Valentino Pascucci
René Rivera
Félix Rodríguez
Ted Silva
Josh Towers
Wilson Valdez
Jered Weaver
Delwyn Young

References

External links
Camden Riversharks official website

 
Sports in Camden, New Jersey
Defunct Atlantic League of Professional Baseball teams
Defunct baseball teams in New Jersey
Opening Day Partners
Professional baseball teams in New Jersey
Baseball teams established in 2001
Baseball teams disestablished in 2015
Sports in Philadelphia
2001 establishments in New Jersey
2015 disestablishments in New Jersey